Suragabad (also Romanized as Sūragābād; also known as Sūregābād-e Chalpaee) is a village in Sorkh Qaleh Rural District, in the Central District of Qaleh Ganj County, Kerman Province, Iran. At the 2006 census, its population was 534, in 107 families.

References 

Populated places in Qaleh Ganj County